Glassdrive–Q8–Anicolor is a Portuguese professional cycling team based in Vila Nova de Gaia. It is one of the European teams in UCI Continental Tour.

Team roster

Major wins 

2000
Stage 4 GP Torres Vedras, Paulo Ferreira
2001
Stage 7 Volta a Portugal, Santiago Pérez
2002
GP Ciudad de Vigo, Nuño Marta
2003
Overall GP CTT Correios, Nuño Marta
Stage 1, Nuño Marta
2004
Stage 3 Volta ao Algarve, Martin Garrido
2005
Stage 1 Vuelta a Castilla y Léon, Sergio Ribeiro
Stage 5 Volta ao Alentejo, Sergio Ribeiro
Stage 10 Volta a Portugal, Claus Michael Møller
2006
Stage 1 Volta ao Distrito de Santarém, Sergio Ribeiro
Overall Volta ao Alentejo, Sergio Ribeiro
Stage 5, Sergio Ribeiro
2007
Stage 2 Volta a Portugal, Francisco Pacheco
2008
1st Stage 3 & 5 Vuelta a Extremadura, Francisco Pacheco
Stage 1 GP CTT Correios, Francisco Pacheco
Stage 4 & 5 Volta a Portugal, Francisco Pacheco
2009
Overall Volta de São Paulo, Sergio Ribeiro
Stage 2 & 3, Sergio Ribeiro
2010
Stage 5 Vuelta a Castilla y León, Sergio Ribeiro
Stage 2 Volta ao Alentejo, Bruno Pires
 Road Race Championships, Rui Sousa
Stage 1 GP Torres Vedras, Bruno Lima
Stage 2 & 8 Volta a Portugal, Sérgio Ribeiro
Stage 6 Volta a Portugal, Joaquin Ortega
Stage 9 Volta a Portugal, David Bernabeu
2011
Overall GP Costa Azul, Filipe Cardoso
Stage 3, Filipe Cardoso
GP Llodio, Santiago Pérez
Stage 4 Volta ao Alentejo, Filipe Cardoso
Stage 3 GP Torres Vedras, Sergio Ribeiro
Stage 4 GP Torres Vedras, Raúl Alarcón
Stages 1 & 2 Volta a Portugal, Sérgio Ribeiro
2012
Stage 4 Volta ao Alentejo, Filipe Cardoso
Stage 1 Troféu Joaquim Agostinho, Sérgio Ribeiro
Overall Volta a Portugal, David Blanco
Stage 3, César Fonte
Stage 4, Rui Sousa
Stage 5, Sérgio Ribeiro
Stage 8, David Blanco
2013
 Road Race Championships, Joni Brandão
Stage 2 Volta a Portugal, Rui Sousa
2014
Prologue Troféu Joaquim Agostinho, Víctor de la Parte
Prologue Volta a Portugal, Víctor de la Parte
2015
Stage 3 Troféu Joaquim Agostinho, David de la Fuente
Stage 4 Volta a Portugal, Filipe Cardoso
2016
Overall Grande Prémio Internacional Beiras e Serra da Estrela
Stage 3, Joni Brandão
Stages 1 & 9 Volta a Portugal em Bicicleta, Daniel Mestre
2017
 Overall GP Internacional Beiras e Serra de Estrela, Jesús del Pino
 Sprints classification, Sérgio Paulinho
Stage 3b Troféu Joaquim Agostinho, Daniel Mestre
Stage 7 Volta a Portugal, António Barbio
2018
Clássica Aldeias do Xisto, Daniel Mestre
 Teams classification, GP Internacional Beiras e Serra de Estrela
 Points classification Troféu Joaquim Agostinho, Henrique Casimiro
Stage 3, Henrique Casimiro
 Sprints classification Vuelta a la Comunidad de Madrid, Marcos Jurado
2019
Stage 3 GP Beiras e Serra da Estrela, Joni Brandão
 Overall Troféu Joaquim Agostinho, Henrique Casimiro
2020
Stage 1 Troféu Joaquim Agostinho, Luís Mendonça
Stage 4 Volta a Portugal, Joni Brandão
Stage 7 Volta a Portugal, António Carvalho
2021
 U23 Time Trial Championships, Fábio Fernandes
 Overall Volta ao Alentejo, Mauricio Moreira
Stage 5 (ITT), Mauricio Moreira
 Overall Troféu Joaquim Agostinho, Frederico Figueiredo
Prologue, Stages 1, 7 & 10 (ITT) Volta a Portugal, Rafael Reis
Stage 4 Volta a Portugal, Frederico Figueiredo
Stage 9 Volta a Portugal, Mauricio Moreira
2022
 Time Trial Championships, Rafael Reis
 U23 Road Race Championships, Afonso Eulálio
 Overall Troféu Joaquim Agostinho, Frederico Figueiredo
Stage 3, Frederico Figueiredo
 Overall Volta a Portugal, Mauricio Moreira
Prologue, Rafael Reis
Stages 3 & 10 (ITT), Mauricio Moreira
Stage 5, Frederico Figueiredo
Stage 9, Antonio Carvalho

Notes

References

External links 
 

Efapel
UCI Continental Teams (Europe)
Cycling teams established in 2000